Alinur Velideoğlu is a Turkish advertiser. He founded
"Güzel Sanatlar"  advertisement agency in 1973 with Ünver Oral, and Yiğit Şardan. In 1994, he became shareholder with Bates WorldWide. He is very famous in Turkey in advertisement field. He also became a jury member in the Turkish version of Dancing on Ice around the world.

Interview with Billy Hayes
During the 1999 Cannes Film Festival, Alinur Velidedeoğlu met by chance Billy Hayes, whose story about his life in a Turkish prison after his arrest for hashish smuggling inspired the hit film Midnight Express. Velidedeoğlu made an interview with Billy Hayes, in which Hayes expresses his disappointment with the film adaptation. He made the video available on YouTube site, after being unable to broadcast it on Western television.

References

Living people
Turkish businesspeople
Year of birth missing (living people)